Josia insincera is a moth of the family Notodontidae first described by Louis Beethoven Prout in 1918. It lives in Venezuela, where larvae are reared on Passiflora biflora.

References

External links
"Josia insincera", ZipCodeZoo
"Josia insincera Prout, 1918", Discover Life

Notodontidae of South America
Moths described in 1918